Francis A. Twedell (May 29, 1917 – May 14, 1969) was a guard in the National Football League. He was drafted by the Green Bay Packers in the seventh round of the 1939 NFL Draft and played with the team that season.

References

1917 births
1969 deaths
American football guards
Green Bay Packers players
Minnesota Golden Gophers football players
Players of American football from Minnesota
People from Austin, Minnesota
All-American college football players